Muromsky is a rural locality (a settlement) in Muromsky District, Vladimir Oblast, Russia. The population was 1,071 as of 2010. There are 6 streets.

Geography 
Muromsky is located 4 km southeast of Murom. Murom is the nearest rural locality.

References 

Rural localities in Muromsky District